Georges Hobeika (born 8 February 1962, in Baskinta) is a Lebanese fashion designer of haute couture and ready-to-wear clothing. Hobeika officially opened his atelier in Beirut, Lebanon in 1995, and has been presenting his collections in Paris, during the city’s official fashion weeks, for over a decade. Hobeika is officially recognized by the "Chambre Syndicale de la Haute Couture", as a guest member.

Today, Hobeika owns and manages his fashion house which includes four lines: Georges Hobeika Couture – Georges Hobeika Bridal – Georges Hobeika Signature – GH by Georges Hobeika. Georges Hobeika operates the fashion label from his showroom on the rue Royale in Paris and from his atelier headquarters in Beirut.

Early years

Hobeika was born in Baskinta, a village in the mountains of Lebanon, and was one of eight siblings. His mother, Marie, was a seamstress and encouraged her children to assist her in her boutique atelier. Hobeika particularly liked his mother’s vocation and pursued it as a passionate hobby.

Hobeika studied civil engineering in university, and pursued architectural design in his studies. The Lebanese Civil War forced him to leave the country in order to secure a better future for him and his family. Hobeika traveled to Paris and worked as an intern for several Parisian fashion houses, including Chanel.

The Georges Hobeika Design Label 
After returning from Paris, Georges Hobeika opened his first atelier location in Beirut, Lebanon in 1995. Around this time, his mother closed her atelier and referred all of her clients to him. They worked together to establish a fashion label.

In 2001, Hobeika had his first show in Paris, at "Hotel K,". Hobeika has shown his couture collections in every biannual Paris Couture Fashion Week since.

In 2010, Georges Hobeika opened a showroom in Paris. Additionally, Hobeika opened a second production facility dedicated to his Signature and GH by Georges Hobeika lines.

Georges Hobeika has diversified into a décor line of couture furnishings and home accessories.

The Georges Hobeika brand is currently headed from Beirut and has official PR representation branches in Paris (in-house), Los Angeles and Beijing. Hobeika has partnered with Maison Lesage, Swarovski, Maison Legeron, Jakob Schlaepfer, and Solstiss for the creation and production of the Georges Hobeika Couture line.

International clientele 
Hobeika has designed clothing for royal families in Saudi Arabia, Qatar and Kuwait. He also has clients from Europe, North and South America, and Asia.

On 19 December 2012, Georges Hobeika received worldwide recognition when former Miss USA Olivia Culpo was crowned Miss Universe 2012. Culpo won the title wearing a Georges Hobeika gown for the final evening gown segment of the competition. It was the first time a couture gown that debuted during a Paris Couture Week was worn for the competition.

See also 
 List of grands couturiers

References

External links
Official Website

Lebanese fashion designers
Lebanese businesspeople in fashion
Wedding dress designers
High fashion brands
Living people
Haute couture
Artists from Beirut
1962 births